The Australia cricket team toured South Africa from 20 February to 17 April 2009, playing three Test matches, two Twenty20 Internationals and five One Day Internationals against South Africa.

Squads

Tasmanian Brett Geeves was called up to the Australian squad during the First Test after Doug Bollinger suffered an abdominal-muscle strain while training in the nets.
After the First Test of the series, Western Australian fast bowler Steve Magoffin, was flown to join the touring squad as cover for Hilfenhaus and Siddle who were in doubt for the Second Test.
South Africa called up Albie Morkel to replace Lonwabo Tsotsobe who injured his right knee in training during the First Test.
With Smith injured, South Africa called up Ashwell Prince and Imraan Khan, and dropped Neil McKenzie and Morné Morkel.

Test series

1st Test

Selections: Australia picked three debutants for this Test (Phillip Hughes, Marcus North and Ben Hilfenhaus) making it the first such time since December 1985 when Geoff Marsh, Merv Hughes and Bruce Reid started their Test careers against India in Adelaide.  Doug Bollinger was relegated to twelfth man.

Australia won the toss and elected to bat.
Note: this is the first Test match Australia has played under the new "referral" system.

Day One: The conditions provided seam and swing for the bowlers and South Africa took full advantage early to have Australia struggling at 38/3.  Ponting (83) and Clarke (68) put on 113 for the fourth wicket before Ponting was bowled by a massive in-swinger from Ntini.  After Clarke fell with the score on 182, North (47*) and Haddin (37*) took the score to 254/5 from 68 overs, when bad light, and then rain, stopped play for the day.
Dale Steyn was the pick of the bowlers with 3/82 from 19 overs, being both dangerous and economical early.
Day Two: Haddin and North added 113 for the 5th wicket before the wicket-keeper was caught on 63.  Marcus North (117) then continued on to make a century on debut (becoming the 18th Australian to do so, and the first against South Africa.)  North and Mitchell Johnson (96*) put on 117 for the 7th wicket (a new record partnership for that wicket against South Africa). Mitchell Johnson later hit 26 from one over from Harris (an Australian Test record) before being stranded on 96 not out when Siddle and Hilfenhaus were dismissed off consecutive deliveries. Australia finished all out for 466.
Steyn 4/113 and Morkel 3/117 were the pick of the bowlers.
South Africa's response did not start well when Smith (0) and Alma (1) were dismissed with only 2 on the board.  They finished the day at 85/3, with McKenzie 35* and de Villiers 13*.
Day Three: AB de Villiers (104*) and McKenzie (36) were the only batsmen to pass 30 as South Africa were dismissed for 220.
All the Australian bowlers used took a wicket with Mitchell 4/25 and Siddle 3/76 the best.
The day ended early due to bad light with Australia 51/1 at the close; Hughes 36* and Ponting 1*.
Morné Morkel took the only wicket.
Day Four: From 99/1 Australia lost 4 wickets for 5 runs and were dismissed for 207.  Hughes with 75 was the only batsman to pass 50.  This gave Australia a lead of 453 with a day and almost 2 sessions to play.
For South Africa, Kallis and Ntini both took 3 wickets.
South Africa in reply started solidly reaching 178/2 from 55 overs at the close.  Smith top-scored with 69.
Johnson and Hilfenhaus took a wicket each.
Day Five: South Africa progressed steadily to 206/2 when Amla was dismissed for 57.  Wickets then fell steadily with the home team losing 8/85 to be all out for 291 just after tea.  Johnson took 4/112, Siddle 3/46, Hilfenhaus 2/68 and McDonald 1/31.

2nd Test

Selections: Australia and South Africa both went into the game with unchanged sides.

Australia won the toss and elected to bat.
Note: the "referral" system was amended for this Test to allow the third umpire to use "hot-spot" technology.

Day One: Australia's openers put on 184 for the first wicket as Phillip Hughes (115) became the fourth youngest Australian to score a Test century.  South Africa's bowlers appeared lethargic before striking back later in the day, but not before Katich (108) had scored his 6th Test century.  Australia finished the day at 303/4 with Hussey (37*) and North (17*) at the crease.  Bad light stopped play an over short.
Day Two: South Africa's bowlers started the second day in better style and, after a wicketless first hour, found form on a lively pitch to take Australia from 4/329 to be all out for 352. Australia lost 5-4 in 18 deliveries, after Hussey and Steyn has a verbal slanging match mid-pitch. Hussey (50) and North (38) were the only batsmen to score anything over 5 runs for the day.  All the bowlers, bar Duminy, took a wicket with Steyn the best with 3/83 from 25.4 overs.
Mitchell Johnson opened the bowling for the visitors and produced one of the best spells of fast, swing bowling seen in some time.  He dismissed McKenzie (0) and Alma (0) in his first over, and then struck Graeme Smith on the hand in his second.  Smith retired hurt with a broken finger and will take no further part in the match.  Johnson later hit Kallis on the chin with a fast bouncer and the South African also retired hurt, though he was to return later in the innings.  McDonald took three quick wickets after Tea and South Africa ended an eventful day at 138/7, with Duminy 73* and Steyn 8*.
Day Three: Peter Siddle opened the bowling on day three and wrapped up the South African first innings in three deliveries.  JP Duminy did not face a ball.  South Africa were dismissed (with Smith not returning to the crease) for 138, giving Australia a first innings lead of 214.  Ponting did not enforce the follow-on, and, in reply, Australia produced another 50-run opening stand before Katich (30) was dismissed with the score on 55.  Hughes and Ponting (81) then put on a partnership of 164 before Hughes became the youngest player in history to score centuries in each innings of a Test match.  Australia finished the day at 292/3.
Day Four: Australia pushed for quick runs on the fourth morning and declared at 331/5 with a lead of 545.  Hughes was the pick of the batsmen with 160. With that innings Hughes became the youngest cricketer in the history of the game to achieve the milestone of scoring a century in both innings  The South African bowlers spread the wickets around with none taking more than one.
South Africa's second innings began well with Alma (43) opening with McKenzie (31) in the absence of Smith.  Both were out by the time the score was 82, both dismissed by Siddle.  After that, the experienced pair of Kallis (84*) and De Villiers (68*) appeared to be playing a different game as they took the score to 244/2 at the close: an unbroken partnership of 164.
Going into the fifth day, Australia require 7 wickets for a 2-0 lead in the series, and South Africa 302 runs for a record-breaking win.
Day Five: Kallis (93) and De Villiers (84) extended their partnership to 187 before Kallis fell to Johnson.  Wickets then fell steadily throughout the day with South Africa losing 8/103 to be all out for 370 (Smith did not bat in the second innings).  This gave Australia the win by 175 runs and a series-winning lead of 2–0.
Katich and Siddle each took three wickets for the visitors.

3rd Test

Selections: In the absence of the injured Smith Jacques Kallis was appointed captain for South Africa.  Prince replaced Smith, and Khan replaced McKenzie who had been dropped. Bryce McGain made his Test debut in place of Marcus North who came down with illness.

Australia won the toss and elected to bat.

Day One: After Ricky Ponting won his sixth toss in a row Australia's openers started slowly, but looked set before Hughes (33) and Ponting (0) were out just before lunch.  Hussey (20) and Clarke (0) went soon after and Australia were 4/81.  With Katich (55) maintaining one end Haddin (42) and Johnson (35) provided support.  Australia were all out for 209.
Of the South African bowlers Ntini was the best—and most unlucky—early before Harris and Steyn broke through.  Ntini finished with two wickets, which could easily have been five if catches had been held and inside edges had hit the stumps.
In reply South Africa seemed relatively untroubled with the new opening pair of Prince (37*) and Khan (15*) reaching 57/0 at the close.
Day Two: South Africa lost Khan (20) early on day two but were hardly pressed after that.  Prince (150) continued his good domestic form but Alma (46) fell again when seemingly set.  Kallis scored his 31st Test century to be 102*, with de Villiers 39*, and South Africa 404/3 at stumps.
The Australian bowlers looked tired and listless in the face of sustained batting with McGain taking a lot of punishment.
Day Three: Kallis went for his overnight score, and Duminy and Boucher also went cheaply and South Africa were 467/6.  De Villers and Morkel (58) added 124 for the 7th wicket, before South Africa were all out for 651, a lead of 442 on the first innings. De Villiers scored freely throughout the day to reach 163 before being caught on the fence. He was particularly harsh on McGain and McDonald taking 25 from one over from the second of these.
Johnson finished with 4/138 and Katich 2/9 from 3 overs.
Batting a second time Australia ended the day at 102/2, with a very hard fight ahead of them to save the match.
Day Four: Wickets fell steady during the day until Australia reached 6/218.  Johnson (123*) and McDonald (68) then put on 163 for the 7th wicket to get Australia to within sight of making South Africa bat again.  Paul Harris cleaned up the tail and Australia had lost by an innings for only the second time against South Africa, and for the first time in any Test match in over a decade.  Harris finished with 6/127, and with his 3/34 in the first innings, was named Man of the Match.  Johnson scored his maiden Test century off only 86 deliveries.

Twenty20 Series

1st Twenty20

2nd Twenty20

ODI series

1st ODI

2nd ODI

3rd ODI

4th ODI

5th ODI

Only Tour Match-First Class:South African A vs Australians

See also
List of Australia Test cricket records

References

2009 in South African cricket
2008–09 South African cricket season
2008
International cricket competitions in 2008–09
2009 in Australian cricket